This page shows the results of the triathlon competition at the 2002 South American Games, held on August 10, 2002 in Rio de Janeiro, Brazil. For the second time the sport was a part of the multi-sports event. The race (1.5 km swimming, 40 km cycling and 10 km running) started at the Copacabana Beach (Posto 6).

Men's competition

Women's competition

See also
Triathlon at the 2002 Central American and Caribbean Games
Triathlon at the 2003 Pan American Games

References
Results

2002 South American Games events
South American Games
2002